This page lists all described species of the spider family Plectreuridae accepted by the World Spider Catalog :

Kibramoa

Kibramoa Chamberlin, 1924
 K. guapa Gertsch, 1958 — USA, Mexico
 K. hermani Chamberlin & Ivie, 1935 — USA
 K. isolata Gertsch, 1958 — Mexico
 K. madrona Gertsch, 1958 — USA
 K. paiuta Gertsch, 1958 — USA
 K. suprenans (Chamberlin, 1919) (type) — USA
 K. s. pima Gertsch, 1958 — USA
 K. yuma Gertsch, 1958 — USA

† Palaeoplectreurys

† Palaeoplectreurys Wunderlich, 2004
 † P. baltica Wunderlich, 2004

Plectreurys

Plectreurys Simon, 1893
 P. angela Gertsch, 1958 — USA
 P. ardea Gertsch, 1958 — Mexico
 P. arida Gertsch, 1958 — Mexico
 P. bicolor Banks, 1898 — Mexico
 P. castanea Simon, 1893 — USA
 P. ceralbona Chamberlin, 1924 — Mexico
 P. conifera Gertsch, 1958 — USA
 P. deserta Gertsch, 1958 — USA
 P. globosa Franganillo, 1931 — Cuba
 P. hatibonico Alayón, 2003 — Cuba
 P. janzeni Alayón & Víquez, 2011 — Guatemala to Costa Rica
 P. misteca Gertsch, 1958 — Mexico
 P. mojavea Gertsch, 1958 — USA
 P. monterea Gertsch, 1958 — USA
 P. nahuana Gertsch, 1958 — Mexico
 P. oasa Gertsch, 1958 — USA
 P. paisana Gertsch, 1958 — Mexico
 P. schicki Gertsch, 1958 — USA
 P. tecate Gertsch, 1958 — Mexico
 P. tristis Simon, 1893 (type) — USA, Mexico
 P. valens Chamberlin, 1924 — Mexico
 P. vaquera Gertsch, 1958 — Mexico
 P. zacateca Gertsch, 1958 — Mexico

References

Plectreuridae